A terp, also known as a wierde, woerd, warf, warft, werf, werve, wurt or værft, is an artificial dwelling mound found on the North European Plain that has been created to provide safe ground during storm surges, high tides and sea or river flooding. The various terms used reflect the regional dialects of the North European region. In English sources, terp appears to be by far the most common term used.

These mounds occur in the coastal parts of the Netherlands (in the provinces of Zeeland, Friesland and Groningen), in southern parts of Denmark and in the north-western parts of Germany where, before dykes were made, floodwater interfered with daily life. These can be found especially in the region Ostfriesland and Kreis Nordfriesland in Germany. In Kreis Nordfriesland on the Halligen, people still live on terps unprotected by dykes. Terps also occur in the Rhine and Meuse river plains in the central part of the Netherlands. Furthermore, terps can be found more to the south in the province North Holland, like Avendorp near the town of Schagen, and in the towns of Bredene en Leffinge near Oostende in Belgium. Other terps can be found at the mouth of the river IJssel like the one at the hamlet Kampereiland, the province Overijssel and on the former Island of Schokland in the former Zuiderzee, today the reclaimed land Noordoostpolder. Even underneath the town of Den Helder in the north of the province North Holland lies an old terp, named Het Torp.

Terpen in the province of Friesland
In the Dutch province of Friesland, an artificial dwelling hill is called terp (plural terpen). Terp means "village" in Old Frisian and is cognate with English thorp, Danish torp, German Dorf, modern West Frisian doarp and Dutch dorp.

The first terp-building period dates to 500 BC, the second from 200 BC to 50 BC. In the mid-3rd century, the rise of sea level was so dramatic that the clay district was deserted, and settlers returned only around AD 400. A third terp-building period dates from AD 700 (Old Frisian times). This ended with the coming of the dike somewhere around 1200. During the 18th and 19th centuries, many terps were destroyed to use the fertile soil they contained to fertilize farm fields. Terpen were usually well fertilized by the decay of the rubbish and personal waste deposited by their inhabitants over centuries.

Wierden in the province of Groningen 
In the Dutch province of Groningen an artificial dwelling mound is called a wierde (plural wierden). As in Friesland, the first wierde was built around 500 BC or maybe earlier.

List of artificial dwelling mounds 
Place names in the Frisian coastal region ending in -werd, -ward, -uert etc. refer to the fact that the village was built on an artificial dwelling mound (wierde). The greater part of the terp villages, though, have names ending in -um, from -heem or -hiem, meaning (farm)yard, grounds. There are a few village names in Friesland ending with -terp (e.g. Ureterp), referring not to a dwelling mound but merely to the Old Frisian word for village. The first element of the toponyms is quite often a person's name or is simply describing the environmental features of the settlement (e.g. Rasquert (prov. Groningen) Riazuurđ: wierde with reed, where reed grows).

Some 1,200 terpen are recorded in Groningen and Friesland alone. They range from abandoned settlements to mounds with only one or a few farmhouses, to larger villages and old towns. A few of them are listed below.

Friesland 

Aalsum
Bolsward (Boalsert)
Britsum
Cornwerd  (Koarnwert)
Dokkum
Ee
Ferwert
Ginnum
Hegebeintum
Hitzum
Jannum
Jouswier
Leeuwarden (Ljouwert)
Metslawier
Wijnaldum

Groningen 

Adorp
Bedum
Bierum
Ezinge
Feerwerd
Garnwerd
Godlinze
Holwierde
Leens
Middelstum
Niehove
Rottum
Saaksum
Spijk
Stitswerd
Ulrum
Usquert
Wirdum

Northern Germany 

Loquard (East Frisia)
Rysum (East Frisia)
Eckwarden (Butjadingen)
Itzwärden (Land Wursten)

See also
 Platform mound
 Tell (archaeology)
 Crannog

Literature 
 
 Moritz Heyne (1899):  Das deutsche Wohnungswesen. Von den ältesten geschichtlichen Zeiten bis zum 16. Jahrhundert,  Bremen 2012.

External links 

 Warften/Wurten (page of the Society for Schleswig-Holstein History)
 Webseite zu den Warftendörfern Ziallerns und Rysum (private site)
 Historical site of Wüppel in the Wangerland
 Water supply in the North Frisian Marshland (private site)
Manual making a Terp in 12 Steps (post of the Frisia Coast Trail)
Vereniging voor terpenonderzoek (Foundation for terp research, the Netherlands)

Indigenous architecture
Coastal construction
Artificial hills
+
Hills